The men's 1500 metres event at the 1994 European Athletics Championships was held in Helsinki, Finland, at Helsinki Olympic Stadium on 7 and 9 August 1994.

Medalists

Results

Final
9 August

Heats
7 August

Heat 1

Heat 2

Participation
According to an unofficial count, 25 athletes from 16 countries participated in the event.

 (1)
 (1)
 (1)
 (1)
 (1)
 (1)
 (1)
 (3)
 (2)
 (2)
 (2)
 (1)
 (3)
 (1)
 (1)
 (3)

References

1500 metres
1500 metres at the European Athletics Championships